Xenotemna is a genus of moths belonging to the family Tortricidae. It contains only one species, Xenotemna pallorana, which is found in North America, where it has been recorded from Alaska to California, east to Florida and north to Quebec and Ontario.

The length of the forewings is 8.5–14 mm. The colour of the forewings varies from pale yellow to cream or light brown. The hindwings are brownish grey and white or yellowish. Adults are on wing from May to August in two generations per year.

The larvae feed on Aster, Erigeron annuus, Silphium, Solidago, Symphyotrichum novae-angliae, Hypericum perforatum, Medicago sativa, Melilotus officinalis, Trifolium, Monarda fistulosa, Picea glauca, Pinus banksiana, Pinus resinosa, Pinus strobus, Pinus sylvestris, Fragaria, Malus, Prunus pumila, Prunus serotina, Prunus virginiana, Rosa, Comandra umbellata, Ulmus and Verbena from within folded leaves. They reach a length of 16–28 mm. The species overwinters as a mid-instar larva and pupation takes place in the final larval feeding site.

References

External links
tortricidae.com

Archipini
Monotypic moth genera
Moths described in 1869
Moths of North America
Tortricidae genera